Josh Blackwell (born April 5, 1999) is an American football cornerback for the Chicago Bears of the National Football League (NFL). He played college football at Duke.

Professional career

Philadelphia Eagles
After going unselected in the 2022 NFL Draft, Blackwell was signed by the Philadelphia Eagles as an undrafted free agent. He was waived on August 30 as part of the final roster cuts.

Chicago Bears
On August 31, 2022, Blackwell was claimed off waivers by the Chicago Bears. On January 4, 2023, he was placed on injured reserve.

References

External  links
 Chicago Bears bio
 Duke Blue Devils bio

1999 births
Living people
Players of American football from Georgia (U.S. state)
American football cornerbacks
Duke Blue Devils football players
Philadelphia Eagles players
Chicago Bears players